Boetius MacEgan (died May 1650) was a 17th-century Irish Roman Catholic Bishop of Ross.

He was born in the barony of Duhallow in north-west County Cork and educated in France and Spain. He returned to his native Munster as a Franciscan friar in the 1630s and was promoted to several positions of importance in the Franciscan order.

He was an enthusiastic supporter of the Confederation of Kilkenny, which controlled most of Ireland between the 1641 uprising and the Cromwellian conquest of 1649. In 1645 a new Papal nuncio landed in Ireland with arms and funds to support the rebellion and befriended MacEgan, appointing him chaplain general of the Ulster forces. In this capacity MacEgan accompanied the Confederation forces on many campaigns and was present at the Confederation victories at the Battle of Benburb in 1646, Limerick and Kilkenny.

In 1646 he was proposed as bishop of Ross by the nuncio himself and consecrated at Waterford in 1648, but probably never gained access to his see, which remained under Protestant control.

On Cromwell's landing in 1649, MacEgan became very active in rallying the Confederation forces and organising defensive measures. He then joined David Roche's force of untrained men who were intending to relieve the siege of Clonmel. They were however intercepted near Macroom by the seasoned cavalry of Lord Broghill and put to flight. MacEgan himself was captured and taken the following day to the walls of Carrigadrohid castle, which was occupied by Confederation forces, and told to call on them to surrender. He chose instead to exhort them to hold on and as a result was hanged from a nearby tree. The garrison surrendered shortly afterwards. MacEgan's body was later buried in the local churchyard at Aghinagh.

Sources
Boetius MacEgan, Bishop of Ross By Father CANICE MOONEY, O.F.M
 Boetius MacEgan, O.F.M., Bishop Of Ross

1650 deaths
17th-century Roman Catholic bishops in Ireland
Diocese of Cork, Cloyne and Ross
Year of birth unknown